Jean Baptiste Cope (Kopit in Mi’kmaq meaning ‘beaver’) was also known as Major Cope, a title he was probably given from the French military, the highest rank given to Mi’kmaq. Cope was the sakamaw (chief) of the Mi'kmaq people of Shubenacadie, Nova Scotia (Indian Brook 14, Nova Scotia/ Mi’kma'ki).  He maintained close ties with the Acadians along the Bay of Fundy, speaking French and being Catholic. During Father Le Loutre’s War, Cope participated in both military efforts to resist the British and also efforts to create peace with the British.  During the French and Indian War he was at Miramichi, New Brunswick, where he is presumed to have died during the war. Cope is perhaps best known for signing the Treaty of 1752 with the British, which was upheld in the Supreme Court of Canada in 1985 and is celebrated every year along with other treaties on Treaty Day (October 1).

Father Rale's War 

Cope was born in Port Royal and the oldest child of six. During Father Rale's War, at the young age of 28, Cope was probably one of a number of Mi’kmaq who signed the peace treaty, which ended the war between the New Englanders and the Mi’kmaq.

King George’s War 

During King George's War, Cope was a leader in the Shubenacadie region.  There were between 50-150 Mi’kmaq families and a few Acadian farms in the river valley close to the principal Mi’kmaq village named Copequoy. The village had become the site of a Catholic mission in 1722. (The location became a site of two major annual events, All Saints Day and Pentecost, which attracted Mi’kmaq from great distances.)

Le Loutre took over the Shubenacadie mission in 1737.  During King George’s War, Cope and Le Loutre worked together in several engagements against the British forces.

Father Le Loutre’s War 

At the outbreak of Father Le Loutre’s War, the Catholic missionary began to lead the Mi’kmaq and Acadian refugees out of peninsular Nova Scotia to settle in French-ruled territory.  Dozens of Mi’kmaq from Shubenacadie accepted Le Loutre’s offer and followed him to the Isthmus of Chignecto.  But Cope and at least ninety other Mi’kmaq refused to abandon their homes on the Shubenacadie. While Cope may have initially not supported the French initiatives, he would quickly reconsider after Edward Cornwallis established Halifax.

By unilaterally establishing Halifax, the Mi'kmaq believed that the British were violating earlier treaties signed in 1726. He tried to set up peace treaties, but failed. Cornwallis offered to New England Rangers a bounty for the scalps of Mi’kmaq families just as the French had offered a bounty to the Mi’kmaq for the scalps of British colonial families. According to historian Geoffery Plank, by this period, leaders of the conflict on both sides were gradually adopting an uncomplicated, racially based view of the war and their opponents.  Several Mi'kmaq leaders and elders developed views mirroring those held by Cornwallis and other members of the Nova Scotia Council, namely that the conflict was a "race war", and both combatants were "singlemindedly" determined to drive each other from the peninsula of Nova Scotia.

After the establishment of Halifax, Cope seems to have joined Le Loutre at the Isthmus of Chignecto. Stationed in this region, through a series of raids, Cope and the other Mi’kmaq war leaders were able to confine the new settlers to the vicinity of Halifax. British plans to scatter Protestants across peninsular Nova Scotia were temporarily undermined.

Battle at Chignecto 

After the Battle at Chignecto on September 3, 1750, Le Loutre and the French retreated to Beausejour ridge and Lawrence began to build Fort Lawrence on the former Acadian community of Beaubassin.  Almost a month after the battle, on October 15, Cope, disguised in a French officer's uniform, approached the British under a white flag of truce and killed Captain Edward Howe.

Peace Treaty (1752) 

After eighteen months of inconclusive fighting, uncertainties and second thoughts began to disturb both the Mi’kmaq and the British communities. By the summer of 1751 Governor Cornwallis began a more conciliatory policy. For more than a year, Cornwallis sought out Mi’kmaq leaders willing to negotiate a peace.  He eventually gave up, resigned his commission and left the colony.

With a new Governor in place, Governor Peregrine Hopson, the first and only willing Mi’kmaq negotiator to come forward and negotiate was Cope.  On 22 November 1752, Cope finished negotiating a peace for the Mi’kmaq at Shubenacadie. The basis of the treaty was the one signed in Boston which closed Father Rale's War (1725). Cope tried to get other Mi’kmaq chiefs in Nova Scotia to agree to the treaty but was unsuccessful.  The Governor became suspicious of Cope’s actual leadership among the Mi’kmaq people. Of course, Le Loutre and the French were outraged at Cope’s decision to negotiate at all with the British.

Attack at Jeddore 

In retaliation for the Attack at Country Harbour, on the night of April 21 (19 May), under the command of Major Cope, Mi'kmaq warriors attacked a diplomatic delelgation made up of Captain Bannerman and his crew in the area of Jeddore, Nova Scotia.  On board were nine British passengers and one Anthony Casteel, who was the pilot and spoke French.  The Mi'kmaq killed the British passengers and let Casteel off at Port Toulouse, where the Mi'kmaq sank the schooner after looting it.

As the war continued, on 23 May 1753, Cope burned the peace treaty of 1752.   The peace treaty signed by Cope and Hobson had not lasted six months. Shortly after, Cope joined Le Loutre again and worked to convince Acadians to join the exodus from peninsula Nova Scotia.

After the experience with Cope, the British were less willing to trust Mi’kmaq efforts for peace that followed over the next two years.  Future peace treaties also failed because the Mi’kmaq proposals always included land claims, which the British presumed was tantamount to giving land to the French.

In the action of 8 June 1755, a naval battle off Cape Race, Newfoundland, on board the French ships Alcide and Lys were found 10,000 scalping knives for Acadians and Indians serving under Chief Cope and Acadian Beausoleil as they continue to fight Father Le Loutre's War.

French and Indian War 

During the French and Indian War, Lawrence declared another bounty on scalps of male Mi’kmaq.  Cope was probably among the Mi’kmaq and the Algonquian allies who helped Acadians evade capture during the St. John River Campaign. According to Louisbourg account books, from 1756 to 1758, the French made regular payments to Cope and other natives for British scalps. Cope is reported to have gone to Miramichi, New Brunswick, in the area where French Officer Boishebert had his refugee camp for Acadians escaping the deportation. He is likely to have died in the region before 1760.

Battle at St. Aspinquid's Chapel 

Tradition indicates that during the French and Indian War, Lahave Chief Paul Laurent and a party of eleven invited  Shubenacadie Chief Jean-Baptiste Cope and five others to St. Aspinquid’s Chapel (in present-day Point Pleasant Park) to negotiate peace with the British. Chief Paul Laurent had just arrived in Halifax after surrendering to the British at Fort Cumberland on 29 February 1760. In early March 1760, the two parties met and engaged in armed conflict. Chief Larent's party killed Cope and two others, while Chief Cope’s party killed five of the British supporters. Shortly after Cope's death, Mi'kmaq chiefs signed a peace treaty in Halifax on 10 March 1760.  Chief Laurent signed on behalf of the Lahave tribe and a new chief, Claude Rene, signed on behalf of the Shubenacadie tribe. (During this time of surrender and treaty making, tensions among the various factions who were allied against the British were evident. For example, a few months after the death of Cope, the Mi'kmaq militia and Acadian militias made the rare decisions to continue to fight despite losing the support of the French priests who were encouraging surrender.)

Legacy 

After the treaty of 1752, while the conflict continued, the British never returned to their old policy of driving the Mi’kmaq off the peninsula. The treaty signed by Cope and Governor Hobson was upheld in 1985 Supreme Court (See R v. Simon). Currently there is a monument to the Peace Treaty on the Shubenacadie Reserve (Indian Brook 14, Nova Scotia).  The descendants of Cope gave Cope's gun to the Citadel Hill (Fort George) museum of Parks Canada.

Author Thomas Raddall wrote about Cope in his novel Roger Sudden.

See also 
Military history of Nova Scotia
Military history of the Mi’kmaq people

References
Notes

Citations

Sources
Primary sources
 

Secondary sources

External links 
 1752 Peace Treaty
 Treaty Day - October 1
  Daniel Paul - Major Jean-Baptiste Cope
 Major Cope - Film Short by Shawn Scott, Heroes and Hants Association

1698 births
18th-century deaths
18th-century indigenous people of the Americas
Mi'kmaq people
Military history of Acadia
Military history of Nova Scotia
Acadian history
People from Miramichi, New Brunswick
Native American leaders
Indigenous leaders in Atlantic Canada
People of Father Le Loutre's War